Nuussuup Nuua (old spelling: Nûgssûp Nûa) is a cape in Avannaata municipality in northwestern Greenland.

Geography 

The cape is an alternative endpoint for Melville Bay, although the common definition limits the bay to Wilcox Head, the western promontory on Kiatassuaq Island, at the northern end of Inussulik Bay, thus excluding the latter. The other end is defined as Cape York,  to the northwest, in northern Baffin Bay.

References 

Headlands of Greenland
Inussulik Bay
Sugar Loaf Bay
Upernavik Archipelago